The men's high jump field event at the 1960 Olympic Games took place on September 1. Thirty-two athletes from 23 nations competed.  The maximum number of athletes per nation had been set at 3 since the 1930 Olympic Congress. The event was won by Robert Shavlakadze of the Soviet Union, the nation's first victory in the men's high jump. Valery Brumel took silver; both men surpassed the previous best placing for the Soviet team of bronze. American John Thomas took bronze to keep alive the United States' streak of medaling in every edition of the Olympic men's high jump.

Background

This was the 14th appearance of the event, which is one of 12 athletics events to have been held at every Summer Olympics. The returning finalists from the 1956 Games were gold medalist Charles Dumas of the United States, silver medalist Chilla Porter of Australia, fourth-place finisher Stig Pettersson of Sweden, and eleventh-place finisher Maurice Fournier of France. The world record holder, and possibly the "heaviest favorite in any athletics event" in 1960, was John Thomas of the United States. Valery Brumel of the Soviet Union was considered his biggest challenger; Dumas and the other Soviets (Robert Shavlakadze and Viktor Bolshov) were also outside contenders.

Iraq and Tunisia each made their debut in the event; Germany appeared for the first time as the United Team of Germany. The United States appeared for the 14th time, having competed at each edition of the Olympic men's high jump to that point.

Competition format

The competition used the two-round format introduced in 1912. There were two distinct rounds of jumping with results cleared between rounds. The qualifying round had the bar set at 1.90 metres, 1.95 metres, and 2.00 metres. All jumpers clearing 2.00 metres in the qualifying round advanced to the final. The final had jumps at 1.90 metres, 1.95 metres, 2.00 metres, 2.03 metres, 2.06 metres, 2.09 metres, 2.12 metres, and then increased by 0.02 metres until a winner was found. Each athlete had three attempts at each height.

Records

The world and Olympic records (in metres) prior to the 1960 Summer Olympics:

Each of the three Soviets matched the Olympic record of 2.12 metres: Valery Brumel, Robert Shavlakadze, and Viktor Bolshov. John Thomas skipped that height; he joined the three Soviets in all successfully breaking the Olympic record at 2.14 metres. Shavlakadze and Brumel were able to extend the new record further, to 2.16 metres, where it stood at the end of the 1960 Games.

Schedule

All times are Central European Time (UTC+1)

Results

All jumpers reaching 2.00 metres advanced to the finals. All heights are listed in metres.

Qualifying

Final

References

M
High jump at the Olympics
Men's events at the 1960 Summer Olympics